North Olmsted High School is a public high school located in the Cleveland suburb of North Olmsted, Ohio. It is the only high school administered by the North Olmsted City School District.

Athletics

State championships
Boys' soccer: 1977, 1985, 1996, 1999

Clubs and teams
NOHS has had an orchestra as far back as 1930, a concert band since 1949 and a marching band since 1951. Alongside the band are the NOHS Eaglets, or cheerleaders. As of 2020 a drama club called the Eagle's Nest Theatre performs twice a year in fall and winter. Student participation in news and announcements is encouraged through the Eagle News Network. A computer club is also present, as is a team for the U.S. National Chemistry Olympiad, sponsored by the American Chemical Society. A math team competes in the Ohio Mathematics League Contests and the American Mathematics Competition. There is also ski club, as well as French and Spanish clubs.

The school also has a boys football, soccer, cross-country, basketball, golf, hockey, bowling, wrestling, swim, baseball, tennis, and track team. They have a girls soccer, volleyball, golf, tennis, basketball, bowling, swimming, dance, gymnastics, cheer, softball, and track team.

Notable events
On September 16, 1990, two juveniles broke into the school and vandalized it, leaving a burning cigarette near an overturned oil lamp, leading to a fire that caused over $3 million in damage to the building. As a result of the fire, classes were temporarily relocated to the I-X Center, an exhibition center in nearby Cleveland.

On October 13, 2020 a football player on the boys football team tested positive for COVID-19. The School District subsequently pulled out of the state playoffs, and canceled all remaining games and practices.

Notable alumni
Tony Gardner, Designer and special effects makeup artist
Thom Hatch, author and historian
Jennifer Lyn Jackson, Playboy playmate
Scott Medvin, Former MLB player (Pittsburgh Pirates, Seattle Mariners)
Daniel S. Papp, Kennesaw State University President
Adam Russell, Pitcher for the Tampa Bay Rays MLB

References

External links

High schools in Cuyahoga County, Ohio
Public high schools in Ohio